The Vice Premier of the Cabinet assists the Premier of North Korea in guiding the work of the Cabinet of North Korea. The office is also alternatively known as Deputy Prime Minister of North Korea.

First Vice Premier
The First Vice Premier of the Cabinet is the designation for the most senior Vice Premier.

Second Vice Premier

Vice Premier of North Korea 

The Premier is represented by a number of vice premiers, who act as a high-ranking executive assistant to the Premier.

See also

Prime Minister of Imperial Korea (1895–1910)
Government of North Korea
List of leaders of North Korea
List of heads of state of North Korea
President of North Korea
Eternal President of the Republic
Politics of North Korea

References

Cabinet of North Korea